Nicolas Siouffi (1829 (Damascus) – 1901 (unknown)) was a Syrian Christian, and later French citizen and vice-consul at Mosul, remembered for his study of Mandaeism.

Mandaeans were known locally in Arabic as Ṣubba, which Siouffi identified with the Sabians, a People of the Book in the Quran. Siouffi claimed to have identified 4000 Sabians in the Mandaean population. This was well received by the theosophist G. R. S. Mead, but received highly critical reviews from scholars, accusing Siouffi of ignorance and his teacher of dishonesty.

References

Syrian Christians
Iraqi Christians
Religion in Iraq
1829 births
1901 deaths
People from Damascus
Scholars of Mandaeism